Hemi Pomara (born c. 1830; sometimes spelled Pomare) was a Māori man of chiefly status, from the Chatham Islands. In his youth, he was taken to Sydney, and then London, before returning to New Zealand, via Barbados, where he was shipwrecked. A daguerreotype of Pomara is the oldest known photograph of any Māori person. A novel and a planned film are based on his life.

Early life 

His family were massacred by a rival tribe, leaving him an orphan.

Sydney 

In late 1844, Pomara was taken on the brig Coolangatta to Sydney, the capital of the then Colony of New South Wales, by the artist George French Angas, who became his guardian. While there he attended an English boarding school. Angas took Pomara with him as he gave lectures in New South Wales and the neighbouring Province of South Australia, and painted a watercolour portrait of Pomara to use as an illustration in a lecture series called "Illustrations of the Natives and Scenery of Australia and New Zealand together with 300 portraits from life of the principal Chiefs, with their Families". This portrait survives, and is now in the collection of the National Library of New Zealand.

London 

Departing on the Royal Tar on 10 September 1845, Angas took Pomara to England, via Rio de Janeiro. They arrived at Gravesend on 23 February 1846. Angas documented the voyage in his 1847 book Savage Life And Scenes In Australia And New Zealand, in which Pomara is mentioned but once, and briefly, as "My young New Zealander, Pomara".

Pomara attended the March 1846 opening of an exhibition of Angas's watercolours at the Egyptian Hall in London. He was then exhibited there, alongside Angas's paintings. On 3 April 1846 he was introduced to Queen Victoria and Prince Albert, during a private viewing.  A woodcut depicting Pomara was published in The Illustrated London News, 18 April 1846 edition, where he was named as "James Pomara" who "has been educated in New South Wales, speaks English fluently, and is a very intelligent person.".

In late March or early April, he attended a meeting of the Royal Society, where he was presented to an audience including Charles Dickens, Charles Darwin, and Antoine Claudet. The later was a pioneering French daguerreotypist, working in London. Pomara sat for Claudet, wearing the same cloak that he wore for the Angas portrait.

Shipwreck 

Later in 1846, Pomara sailed on the Caleb Angas, which was shipwrecked off Barbados. He survived, and put to sea again, on the Eliza. During that voyage, he was assaulted by the ship's first mate, who was later prosecuted as a result. By 1847 Pomara was in Auckland.

Later life 

Little is known of Pomara's activities, after his arrival in Auckland.

In 1864 Hare Pomare, his wife Hariata, and baby Victor Albert visited London was part of a Māori delegation. It is possible that Hare and Hemi were the same person.

Legacy 

The title character of The Imaginary Lives of James Pōneke, a 2018 novel by Tina Makereti, is based on Pomara. As of July 2020, a film version, produced by Taika Waititi, is planned.

In 2020 Claudet's hand-tinted daguerreotype was identified in the National Library of Australia, having  been purchased for the library in 1960, by Eric Keast Burke. It is the oldest known photograph of a Māori person.

Contrary opinion 

An unnamed writer in New Zealand doubted Angas' story regarding Pomara's origins:

Notes

References

Further reading 

  (catalogue of the exhibition at the Egyptian Hall)
 

New Zealand Māori people
People from the Chatham Islands
Year of birth uncertain
New Zealand emigrants to England
Ngāti Mutunga people
19th-century births
Shipwreck survivors